The 2021–22 North Carolina Central Eagles men's basketball team represented North Carolina Central University in the 2021–22 NCAA Division I men's basketball season. The Eagles, led by 13th-year head coach LeVelle Moton, played their home games at McDougald–McLendon Arena in Durham, North Carolina as members of the Mid-Eastern Athletic Conference.

Previous season
The Eagles finished the 2020–21 season 5–9, 3–5 in MEAC play to finish in third place in the Southern Division. In the MEAC tournament, they lost to Norfolk State in the quarterfinals.

Roster

Schedule and results

|-
!colspan=12 style=| Regular season

|-
!colspan=9 style=| MEAC tournament

Sources

References

North Carolina Central Eagles men's basketball seasons
North Carolina Central Eagles
North Carolina Central Eagles men's basketball
North Carolina Central Eagles men's basketball